Persatuan Industri Rakaman Malaysia (RIM) (English: Recording Industry Association of Malaysia) is a Malaysian non-profit music organisation, founded on 12 December 1978, as the Malaysian Association of Phonograph Producers (MAPP). In the end of the 1980s, it changed its name to Malaysian Association of Phonogram and Videogram Producers and Distributors (MAPV). It adopted its current name in 1996.

It currently represents over 340 locally incorporated recording companies and businesses, all of which are involved in the production, manufacturing and distribution of local and international sound, music video and karaoke recording. This accounts for around 95% of all legitimate recordings commercially available in the music market of Malaysia.

Under the Ministry of Domestic Trade & Consumer Affairs (MDTCA), RIM is a member of the Ministry's Special Copyright Task Force. It was also a member of the Attorney General's Chambers' Copyright Law Revision Committee.

The International Federation of the Phonographic Industry (IFPI) recognises RIM as the National Group for Malaysia. The RIM Chairman sits on the IFPI Asia/Pacific Regional Board. RIM also is a member of the Asean Music Industry Association (AMIA).

It has been responsible for organising the annual music event, Anugerah Industri Muzik (AIM).

Certification levels 
RIM is responsible for certifying gold and platinum albums in Malaysia, based on sales. The levels are:

Music CDs

International repertoire

Note: Awards for domestic and international repertoire are different before 2006.

Combined sales

Introduced in July 2009.

Digital downloads

Introduced in July 2009.

Record charts 
Since 2017, RIM operates a record charts that ranks the best-performing songs in Malaysia. The main RIM Chart lists the Top 20 most streamed international & domestic songs in Malaysia, with a separate chart for the Top 10 most streamed domestic songs.

As of the issue for the week ending July 1, 2021, the RIM International Charts has had 59 different number-one songs. While the RIM Domestic Charts has had 41 different number-one songs.

From April 2022, RIM began listing the Top 10 most streamed Chinese songs in Malaysia.

Song achievements

Songs with most weeks at number one
16 weeks
 Luis Fonsi and Daddy Yankee featuring Justin Bieber – "Despacito" (2017)
 Ed Sheeran – "Perfect" (2017-2018)
 Joji – "Glimpse of Us" (2022)
12 weeks
 Camila Cabello featuring Shawn Mendes – "Señorita" (2019)
11 weeks
 Ed Sheeran – "Shape of You" (2017)
 Tones and I – "Dance Monkey" (2019-2020)
10 weeks
 Ariana Grande – "7 Rings" (2019)
 Adele – "Easy on Me" (2021)

Number-one songs 
List of number-one songs of 2017 (Malaysia)
List of number-one songs of 2018 (Malaysia)
List of number-one songs of 2019 (Malaysia)
List of number-one songs of 2020 (Malaysia)
List of number-one songs of 2021 (Malaysia)
List of number-one songs of 2022 (Malaysia)

See also 
 Music industry
 List of music recording certifications

References

External links 
 

Music industry associations
Music organisations based in Malaysia
Organizations established in 1978
1978 establishments in Malaysia